The 1928 New Zealand general election was held on 13 and 14 November in the  Māori and European electorates, respectively, to elect 80 MPs to the 23rd session of the New Zealand Parliament.

1928 was the year postal voting was introduced for certain specified groups (e.g. invalids) who could not get to a polling booth on election day.

The election
The 1928 election was held on Tuesday, 13 November in the Māori electorates, and on Wednesday, 14 November in the general electorates to elect a total of 80 MPs to the 23rd session of Parliament. A total of 844,633 electors were registered on the European roll, of which 743,691 (88.05%) turned out to vote. All 80 electorates were contested. 47 and 29 electorates were in the North Island and South Island, respectively, plus the 4 Māori electorates.

In 1927, a faction of the decaying Liberal Party formed a new organisation, which was eventually named the United Party. In 1928, to the considerable surprise of most observers and many members of the party itself, United won a considerable victory, taking Auckland East and Grey Lynn from Labour. The United Government came to power with Labour support. Labour, forming the official opposition since 1926, were thus replaced by Reform. Six Independents were elected (most with allegiances to the main parties. Four of these backed United, one supported Reform and one favoured neither.

The  electorate went to Harold Rushworth of the Country Party after a recount of the votes, but the election was declared void January 1929. Rushworth won the resulting by-election. This marked the Country Party's first entry into Parliament, where it would retain a presence until 1938.

Result by party

The table below shows the result of the 1928 election.

1 Includes two who won as Independent Reform

2 previously contested as

Votes summary

Initial composition of the 23rd Parliament
The United Party was organised in the House of Representatives, prior to the dissolution of the 22nd Parliament.

The Auckland Star reported on 18 September 1928, that:

...the United Party were assembled yesterday in Wellington when Sir Joseph Ward accepted the leadership of the party. It had previously been decided, by unanimous resolution, that the party should go to the polls as "The United Party"...

The Evening Post newspaper reported on the same day that:

The Rt. Hon. Sir Joseph Ward took his seat as Leader of the United Party in the House of Representatives this afternoon, Mr G.W. Forbes, who has led the Nationalist Party up to the present, relinquishing his former place in favour of Sir Joseph. From now until the end of the session the Nationalist Party ceases to exist under that name.

Key

|-
 |colspan=8 style="background-color:#FFDEAD" | General electorates
|-

|-
 | Hauraki
 | colspan=2 style="text-align:center; background-color:#ececec;" | New electorate
 | style="background-color:;" |
 | style="text-align:center;background-color:;" | Arthur Hall
 | style="text-align:right;" | 891
 | style="background-color:;" |
 | style="text-align:center;" | Ebenezer Allan
|-

|-
 |colspan=8 style="background-color:#FFDEAD" | Māori electorates
|-

|}

Notes

References

External links

 Photos of Members of Parliament as elected in November 1928